Tan Kim Huat (born 28 January 1959) is a Singaporean fencer. He competed in the individual foil and épée events at the 1992 Summer Olympics.

Tan started fencing when he was 14.

In 1987, Tan won the bronze medal in the individual foil at the 1987 Southeast Asian Games. He won three matches and lost two matches against eventual gold and silver medalists, Alkindi and Irawan Dida, both from Indonesia respectively.

In 1989, Tan won the individual foil in the Malaysian Open.

In 1996, Tan won the National Individual Championship and the Singapore Open Championship in both the Foil and Epee events.

Personal life 
Tan married his wife, Gina, in May 1987.

References

External links
 

1959 births
Living people
Singaporean male épée fencers
Olympic fencers of Singapore
Fencers at the 1992 Summer Olympics
Singaporean male foil fencers
Southeast Asian Games bronze medalists for Singapore
Southeast Asian Games medalists in fencing
Competitors at the 1987 Southeast Asian Games